Roger Hedlund can refer to:

 Roger E. Hedlund (born 1935), American pastor
 Roger Hedlund (politician) (born 1979), Swedish politician